"Wonderful" is the debut single by Belgian female singer Iris. The song was written by Guus Fluit, Wouter Vander Veken and Piet Vastenavondt. It was released in Belgium as a digital download on 18 November 2011.

Music video
A music video for the song "Wonderful" was uploaded to YouTube on June 1, 2011 at a total length of three minutes and eleven seconds.

Track listing
Digital download
 "Wonderful" - 3:03

Credits and personnel
Lead vocals – Iris
Producers – Guus Fluit, Wouter Vander Veken
Lyrics – Guus Fluit, Wouter Vander Veken, Piet Vastenavondt
Label: SonicAngel

Charts

Release history

References

2011 debut singles
Iris (singer) songs